El Factor is a town in the María Trinidad Sánchez province of the Dominican Republic, hometown of Leopoldo Minaya, an acclaimed Latin American poet.

References

Sources 
World Gazeteer: Dominican Republic – World-Gazetteer.com

Populated places in María Trinidad Sánchez Province
Municipalities of the Dominican Republic